Lukáš Klíma (born 13 June 1990) is a Slovak professional ice hockey forward playing for Piráti Chomutov of the 1st Czech Republic Hockey League.

Career 
Klíma played six games for HC Karlovy Vary in the Czech Extraliga during the 2010–11 Czech Extraliga season. He also played in the Tipsport Liga for HK Dukla Trenčín, HK Nitra, MHC Martin and HK 36 Skalica.

Personal life 
Klíma is the nephew of former NHL player Petr Klíma.

References

External links

1990 births
Living people
Slovak ice hockey forwards
HK Dubnica players
HC Dukla Jihlava players
HK Dukla Trenčín players
HC Karlovy Vary players
MHC Martin players
HC Most players
HK Nitra players
HK 95 Panthers Považská Bystrica players
Piráti Chomutov players
HC Prešov players
KHK Red Star players
Sportovní Klub Kadaň players
People from Ilava
Sportspeople from the Trenčín Region
Czech ice hockey forwards
Slovak people of Czech descent
Slovak expatriate ice hockey people
Expatriate ice hockey players in Hungary
Expatriate ice hockey players in France
Slovak expatriate sportspeople in Hungary
Slovak expatriate sportspeople in France